The Fort Hays State Tigers football program represents Fort Hays State University in college football. They participate in Division II sports within the NCAA in the Mid-America Intercollegiate Athletics Association (MIAA). The team plays their home games in Lewis Field Stadium, located on the Fort Hays State University campus in Hays, Kansas.

Fort Hays State's football program dates back to 1902. The Tigers claimed have claimed 11 conference championships, including a recent MIAA conference championship in the 2017 season.

Seasons

Chris Brown era

Championships

Conference championships
Source:

Playoff appearances

NCAA Division II 
The Tigers have made four appearances in the NCAA Division II playoffs, with a combined record of 0–4.

All-time record vs. current MIAA teams
Official record (including any NCAA imposed vacates and forfeits) against all current MIAA opponents as of the end of the 2018 season:

Stadium

The Tigers have played their home games in Lewis Field Stadium since 1936.

References

External links
 

 
American football teams established in 1902
1902 establishments in Kansas